is a Japanese speed skater. She has won a total of seven medals at the Olympics, two of them gold.

Career
At the age of 15, Takagi represented Japan at the 2010 Winter Olympics, finishing 35th in the women's 1000 metres and 23rd in the 1500 metres. In 2012 and 2013, she won the World Junior Speed Skating Championships.

After participating in several world cup and world championship events, she became a world champion when in the 2015 World Single Distance Championships she won the gold medal in the team pursuit where she participated together with her sister Nana Takagi and compatriot Ayaka Kikuchi.

In competition in Salt Lake City of 2017–18 ISU Speed Skating World Cup, she with Nana & Ayano Sato won women's team pursuit with the world record of 2 minutes & 50.87 seconds.

In the 2018 Olympics, Takagi won the silver medal in the women's 1500-metre speed skating event and the bronze medal in the women's 1000-metre speed skating event.  Takagi was also part of the Nippon team that won the 2018 Olympics women's team pursuit with a time of 2 minutes & 53.89 seconds, the Olympic record & the sea-level world best.

She won the women's competition at the 2018 World Allround Speed Skating Championships.

In the 2017–18 world cup, the Nippon team she was part of won all women's team pursuit competitions of the world cup & became a 3-continuous-season overall world cup winner in the pursuit & she became overall winner in women's 1500 metres & allround.

She finished second in the 2019 World Allround Speed Skating Championships.

Takagi set a world record in the women's 1500 meters in 2019 with a time of 1:49.83 in Salt Lake City, Utah.

At 2022 Winter Olympics, Takagi earned three silver medals in 1500m, 500m, and team pursuit. At the point when she earned her third medal in the 2022 games, which was her sixth overall, she became the Japanese female athlete with the biggest number of Olympic medals earned, surpassing three other athletes, Miya Tachibana and Miho Takeda in synchronized swimming, and Ryoko Tani in Judo, all of those who have earned 5 Olympic medals each in summer games. Takagi also won her second Olympic gold, and the first one in an individual event, in 1000m with a new Olympic record time of 1:13:19.

Personal records

She is currently in 2nd position in the adelskalender.

Olympic Games
7 medals – (2 gold, 4 silver, 1 bronze)

See also
 List of world records in speed skating
 World record progression 1500 m speed skating women
 World record progression team pursuit speed skating women
 List of Olympic records in speed skating
 List of multiple Olympic medalists at a single Games

References

External links

1994 births
Japanese female speed skaters
Speed skaters at the 2010 Winter Olympics
Speed skaters at the 2018 Winter Olympics
Speed skaters at the 2022 Winter Olympics
Olympic speed skaters of Japan
Speed skaters at the 2011 Asian Winter Games
Speed skaters at the 2017 Asian Winter Games
Medalists at the 2011 Asian Winter Games
Medalists at the 2017 Asian Winter Games
Asian Games medalists in speed skating
Asian Games gold medalists for Japan
Asian Games bronze medalists for Japan
Sportspeople from Hokkaido
Universiade medalists in speed skating
Living people
Medalists at the 2018 Winter Olympics
Medalists at the 2022 Winter Olympics
Olympic medalists in speed skating
Olympic gold medalists for Japan
Olympic silver medalists for Japan
Olympic bronze medalists for Japan
World Allround Speed Skating Championships medalists
World Single Distances Speed Skating Championships medalists
World Sprint Speed Skating Championships medalists
Universiade gold medalists for Japan
Competitors at the 2013 Winter Universiade
20th-century Japanese women
21st-century Japanese women